During the 2010–11 season Cowdenbeath competed in the Scottish First Division, Scottish Cup, Scottish League Cup and the Challenge Cup.

Summary
Cowdenbeath finished ninth in the First Division, entering the play-offs losing 4–2 to Brechin on aggregate and were relegated to the Second Division. They reached the third round of the Scottish Cup, the first round of the League Cup and were eliminated in the second round of the Challenge Cup.

Management
For season 2010–11 Cowdenbeath were managed by Jimmy Nicholl, following the departure of Danny Lennon who had become the new manager of St Mirren.

Results and fixtures

Scottish First Division

First Division play-offs

Scottish Challenge Cup

Scottish League Cup

Scottish Cup

Player statistics

Squad 

|}
a.  Includes other competitive competitions, including playoffs and the Scottish Challenge Cup.

League table

References

Cowdenbeath
Cowdenbeath F.C. seasons